Tomás Ernesto Pineda Nieto (born January 21, 1946) is a retired football player from El Salvador.

International career
Nicknamed el Flaco (the skinny one), Pineda represented El Salvador at the 1970 FIFA World Cup in Mexico, though he did not play a single match. He did appear in 2 qualifying matches for the 1978 FIFA World Cup, but had been playing second fiddle to Raúl Magaña and Gualberto Fernández during his career.

Retirement
After retiring as a player, Pineda went into real estate and has worked as an architect and as an administrator at an automotive company.

Personal life
Pineda is married to Regina and is father of three sons, two of them from his first marriage.

Honours
Primera División de Fútbol de El Salvador: 2
 1971, 1973

References

External links
Profile - El Salvador.com 

1946 births
Living people
Sportspeople from Santa Ana, El Salvador
Association football goalkeepers
Salvadoran footballers
El Salvador international footballers
1970 FIFA World Cup players
Alianza F.C. footballers
C.D. Luis Ángel Firpo footballers